United States v. Thompson-Center Arms Company, 504 U.S. 505 (1992), was a case decided by the Supreme Court of the United States.

Background 
The legal dispute in United States v. Thompson-Center Arms Company arose when officials from the U.S. Bureau of Alcohol, Tobacco, and Firearms contacted Thompson Center Arms informing them that the kit of the Contender Pistol that included a stock and a  barrel constituted a short-barreled rifle under the National Firearms Act.

Arguments 
The U.S. Government's argument centered on the analogy of a disassembled bicycle still being a bicycle.

Stephen Halbrook argued on behalf of Thompson Center Arms and stated that the weapon would have to be assembled with both the stock and the  barrel attached for it to be a short-barreled rifle.

Decision 
The court ruled in Thompson Center Arms' favor in that the carbine conversion kit did not constitute a short-barreled rifle, primarily because the kit contained both the stock and the 16-inch barrel.

Justice Scalia also noted that there is a warning carved on the stock telling the user to not attach the stock to the receiver when the 10-inch barrel is attached to the receiver or vice versa.

This circumstance caused the court to apply the rule of lenity since the NFA carries criminal penalties with it. This meant that ambiguous statutes are interpreted against the government.

See also
 Staples v. United States, illegal possession of a machine gun under U.S. federal law
 List of United States Supreme Court cases, volume 504
 List of United States Supreme Court cases
 Lists of United States Supreme Court cases by volume
 List of United States Supreme Court cases by the Rehnquist Court

References

External links 
 
 Thompson Center Arms
 Stephen Halbrook's Page on the case

United States federal firearms case law
United States Supreme Court cases
United States Supreme Court cases of the Rehnquist Court
1992 in United States case law